"Graves" is a military science fiction short story by Joe Haldeman about haunted military morticians. It was originally published in October 1992 in The Magazine of Fantasy & Science Fiction and appears in The Year's Best Science Fiction (1993), New Masterpieces of Horror (1996) and The Best of Joe Haldeman (2013).

Reception
"Graves" won the 1994 Nebula Award for Best Short Story and World Fantasy for Best Short Fiction.

References

External links 
 

1992 short stories
Nebula Award for Best Short Story-winning works
Works originally published in The Magazine of Fantasy & Science Fiction 
Works by Joe Haldeman
Military science fiction